Sonja Blomdahl (born 1952 in Waltham, Massachusetts) is an American blown glass artist.

Education

Blomdahl began glassmaking as an undergraduate student during the 1970s. She earned a Bachelor of Fine Arts in ceramics from Massachusetts College of Art (Boston) in 1974. There she studied with glass sculptor Dan Dailey. In 1976 she spent six months studying at the Orrefors glassworks in Sweden, and her work is sometimes associated with Scandinavian design. Venetian glass master Checco Ongaro taught Blomdahl the method of double-bubble blowing (or incalmo), for which her work is well known.

Career
In 1978, Blomdahl served as a teaching assistant at the Pilchuck Glass School (Stanwood, Washington) for Dan Dailey, where she first watched Checco Ongaro demonstrate the incalmo technique. She has held teaching positions at the Pratt Fine Arts Center in Seattle; Haystack Mountain School of Crafts in Deer Isle, Maine; and the Appalachian Center in Smithville, Tennessee. Blumdahl's first solo exhibition was at the Traver Sutton Gallery in Seattle in 1981. She opened her own studio in Seattle in 1983, which remained open until 2009. Since the late 2000s, she has moved beyond the symmetrical glass vessels she is known for and worked increasingly with architectural forms.

Collections

American Crafts Museum, New York
Clinton Presidential Library and Museum, Little Rock, AR
Corning Museum of Glass, Corning, NY
Montgomery Museum of Fine Arts
Museum of Contemporary Art & Design, New York
Museum of Decorative Arts, Prague
Museum of Fine Arts, Boston, MA
Racine Art Museum, Racine, WI
Renwick Gallery, Smithsonian American Art Museum, Washington DC

Awards
2001 U.S. State Dept. Gift, presented by President Bush to the Prime Minister of Sweden
1987 Artists' Trust Fellowship Grant, Washington State
1986 NEA Visual Arts Fellowship Grant

See also
 Dale Chihuly

References

External links
 Sonja Blomdahl - official website
 Sonja Blomdahl at Island Press, Kemper Museum at Washington University in St. Louis

Further reading 

 Biskeborn, Susan. Artists at Work: Twenty-Five Northwest Glassmakers, Ceramists, and Jewelers. Anchorage: Alaska Northwest Books, 1990.
 Bullock, Margaret E., and Rock Hushka. Best of the Northwest: Selected Works from Tacoma Art Museum. Tacoma: Tacoma Art Museum, 2012.
 Della, James. Glass, the James Della Collection. [San Francisco]: James Della, 2012.
 Koplos, Janet. "Matters of Mood: The Glass of Sonja Blomdahl." Glass, no. 59 (Spring 1995): 34-41.
 Miller, Bonnie J. "A Meditation of Bowls: Sonja Blomdahl and Her Art." Neues Glas, no 4 (1986): 266-267.
 Nichols, Sarah C., and Davira Spiro Taragin. Contemporary Directions: Glass from the Maxine and William Block Collection. Pittsburgh, Penn: Carnegie Museum of Art, 2002.
 Yelle, Richard Winfred. Glass Art from UrbanGlass. Atglen, PA: Schiffer, 2000.

Living people
1952 births
American glass artists
Women glass artists
Artists from Massachusetts
People from Waltham, Massachusetts
20th-century American women artists
21st-century American women artists